Nymphon brevitarse is a species of sea spider first described by Henrik Nikolai Krøyer in 1844.

Habitat 
This species inhabits the benthic zone. It is found between the shelf and the slope of the ocean floor at a depth of around 100-200m.

Distribution 
Found in the Pacific and Arctic oceans. Has been noted to be a northern species.

References 

Pycnogonids
Animals described in 1844